The Parthian War may refer to:

 The Seleucid–Parthian wars (238–129 BC)
 The Armenian–Parthian War (87–85 BC)
 The Roman–Parthian Wars, including:
 Antony's Parthian War or the Roman-Parthian War (40–33 BC)
 The Roman–Parthian War of 58–63
 Trajan's Parthian War (114–117)
 The Roman–Parthian War of 161–166 or the Parthian War of Lucius Verus
 The Parthian war of Caracalla (216–217)

See also
 Roman–Persian Wars